Esed Kadrić (born 10 September 1979 in Maoča, Brčko) is a Bosnian politician who is the mayor of Brčko since December 2020. 

Kadrić studied at the madrasa of Tuzla and graduated in political sciences at the University of Sarajevo in 2006, also obtaining a master's degree there in 2017. Kadrić was elected member of the Brčko District assembly for the Party of Democratic Action (SDA) in 2004 and 2008. From 2011–2012 he headed the Department of Education of the Brčko District government. He was appointed deputy mayor of Brčko from 2012–2016, and speaker of the Brčko District assembly from 2016–2020. In December 2020, Kadrić was elected by the assembly as mayor of Brčko District. He is President of the SDA party branch in Brčko. He is married and the father of three kids.

References

1979 births
Living people
People from Brčko District
Mayors of places in Bosnia and Herzegovina
Bosnia and Herzegovina politicians
Party of Democratic Action politicians
University of Sarajevo alumni
20th-century Bosnia and Herzegovina people
21st-century Bosnia and Herzegovina people